The Vladivostok Times was an online English-language newspaper based in Vladivostok, Russia.  It was founded in March 2006 and ceased publishing in 2011.

The Times covered Far East Russian regional issues for an international English-speaking audience, as well as tourist information such as consulate contacts, main tourist routes, cultural events, etc.  Its news stories were compiled from English translations of articles from news sources such as PrimaMedia, RIA Novosti, and others.

Sections included:  Economics,  Politics,  Society, Ecology, Culture, Travel Guide.

See also 
 Official Website

References 

Newspapers published in Russia
Asian news websites
Vladivostok